Vizzini is an Italian surname. Notable people with the surname include:

Calogero Vizzini (1877–1954), Italian mob boss
Carlo Vizzini (born 1947), Italian politician
David Vizzini (born 1973), American wrestling coach
Ned Vizzini (1981–2013), American writer

Italian-language surnames